Sarah Phillips (born 4 August 1993) is an English singer. She recorded a cover of Paolo Nutini's "Autumn", using a mobile phone, as a tribute to her mother, who died after a four-year battle with cancer. Phillips' cover of the track was put onto YouTube, and garnered a UK release. The track reached No. 49 in the UK Singles Chart.

Phillips has also recorded "Blue Chair", a song she wrote herself, as well as various other cover versions of songs for an EP to raise money for the charity established in memory of her mother.

References

1993 births
Living people
21st-century English women singers
21st-century English singers